Paramacronychia is a genus of true flies in the family Sarcophagidae.

Species
P. flavipalpis Girschner, 1881

References 

Sarcophagidae
Schizophora genera